Guro Reiten (born 26 July 1994) is a Norwegian professional footballer who plays as a winger for English club Chelsea and the Norway national team. Before joining Chelsea in 2019, she played in Norway for Sunndal, Kattem, Trondheims-Ørn, and LSK Kvinner.

She made her debut for Norway in 2014 and appeared with the team at the UEFA European Championship 2017, 2019 FIFA World Cup, and UEFA European Championship 2022.

Club career

Sunndal
Born in Sunndalsøra, Møre og Romsdal, Reiten grew up in the village of Nordmøre and began her senior career with her local side Sunndal, then in the second division of the Norwegian football.

Kattem
At age 16, Reiten joined Toppserien side Kattem in 2011. During her year-and-a-half spell with Kattem, she made 35 league appearances and scored 11 goals in her second season, becoming the club's 2012 top scorer.

Trondheims-Ørn
After Kattem pulled out of the Toppserien, Reiten joined Trondheims-Ørn in 2013. During her four seasons with Trondheims, she made 82 league appearances and scored 25 goals. With Trondheims-Ørn, she has also reached the final of the 2014 Norwegian Women's Cup.

LSK Kvinner
She then transferred to Toppserien side LSK Kvinner for the 2017 season. During her two-and-a-half seasons with the club, she made 53 league appearances, scoring 51 goals in the process. With LSK Kvinner, Reiten was a back-to-back Toppserien league winner in 2017, also winning the Toppserien's regular season golden boot in the same season. Reiten and LSK Kvinner repeated both these feats in 2018, including winning the 2018 Norway Women's Cup. Reiten also went on to win the 2018 Toppserien Player of the Year and Goal of the Year awards. At her time of departing LSK Kvinner, Reiten was the Toppserien's leading top scorer for the 2019 season.

Chelsea
On 31 May 2019, Reiten signed with the FA Women's Super League side Chelsea. It was reported that the transfer fee was around £12,000.

International career
Reiten has represented Norway at all youth international levels. She made her full international debut for Norway in January 2014, against Spain. She was a member of the Norwegian squad at the UEFA European Championship 2017. In March 2019, Reiten was in the Norwegian squad that went on to win the 2019 Algarve Cup. She was subsequently named to the Norwegian 2019 FIFA World Cup squad in May 2019.

Personal life
Following the 2022 Oslo shooting, Reiten publicly came out as a lesbian in an interview with the Norwegian newspaper Verdens Gang.

Career statistics

Club

International
Scores and results list Norway's goal tally first, score column indicates score after each Reiten goal.

Honours
LSK Kvinner
Toppserien: 2017, 2018
Norwegian Women's Cup: 2018; runner-up: 2014

Chelsea
UEFA Women's Champions League runner-up: 2020–21
FA Women's Super League: 2019–20, 2020–21, 2021–22
Women's FA Cup: 2020–21, 2021–22
FA Women's League Cup: 2019–20, 2020–21; runner-up: 2021–22, 2022–23
Women's FA Community Shield: 2020
Norway
Algarve Cup: 2019
Individual
Toppserien Golden Boot: 2017, 2018
Toppserien Player of the Year: 2018 
Toppserien Goal of the Year: 2018
FA WSL PFA Team of the Year: 2021–22
Norwegian Golden Ball: 2022

References

External links
 
 
 
 

Living people
1994 births
People from Sunndal
Sportspeople from Møre og Romsdal
Norwegian women's footballers
Norway women's international footballers
Association football wingers
Women's association football wingers
SK Trondheims-Ørn players
LSK Kvinner FK players
Chelsea F.C. Women players
Toppserien players
Women's Super League players
Norwegian expatriate women's footballers
Expatriate women's footballers in England
Norwegian expatriate sportspeople in England
UEFA Women's Euro 2017 players
2019 FIFA Women's World Cup players
UEFA Women's Euro 2022 players
LGBT association football players
Lesbian sportswomen